Priyamvada (Priya) Natarajan is a professor in the departments of astronomy and physics at Yale University.  She is noted for her work in mapping dark matter and dark energy, particularly with her work in gravitational lensing, and in models describing the assembly and accretion histories of supermassive black holes. She authored the book Mapping the Heavens: The Radical Scientific Ideas That Reveal the Cosmos.

Early life
Priya Natarajan was born in Coimbatore, Tamil Nadu in India to academic parents. She is one of three children. Natarajan grew up in Delhi, India and studied at Delhi Public School, R. K. Puram.

Education
Natarajan has undergraduate degrees in physics and mathematics from M.I.T. She was also enrolled in the M.I.T. Program in Science, Technology & Society and the M.I.T. Program in Technology and Public Policy from 1991 to 1993.   She did her graduate work in theoretical astrophysics at the Institute of Astronomy, University of Cambridge, England, receiving a Ph.D. degree in 1998. There she was a member of Trinity College and was elected to a Title A Research Fellowship that she held from 1997 to 2003. Prior to coming to Yale, she was a visiting postdoctoral fellow at the Canadian Institute for Theoretical Astrophysics in Toronto, Canada.

Research areas
Natarajan has done extensive work in the following fields:
 Gravitational lensing – combining strong and weak lensing analysis techniques; use of lensing as a probe to study galaxy evolution in clusters via local weak shear effects; weak lensing by large-scale structure; using lensing as a probe of the shapes of dark matter halos; and understanding intrinsic correlations in the shapes of galaxies.
 Clusters of galaxies – using lensing, X-ray and Sunyaev-Zeldovich data in conjunction to study the dynamics of galaxies in clusters; velocity anisotropy of galaxy orbits; characterizing cluster growth and evolution in phase space and physics of the relaxation process.
 Accretion physics – issues of the alignment of the spin of disks and the central black holes; the evolution of warped accretion disks; Lense-Thirring precession; the Blandford-Znajek mechanism, and the accretion history of supermassive black holes.
 Issues in galaxy formation and the fueling of quasars – the connection between high redshift galaxies, active galactic nuclei and their central black holes; the black hole mass function; role of quasars and their outflows in galaxy formation; kinematic Sunyaev-Zeldovich effect from quasars; the physics of feedback processes in galaxy formation; stellar contributors to the X-ray background and the evolution of neutral gas with redshift.
 Binary black holes – the merger and evolution of supermassive black hole binaries in gas-rich galaxy cores; the electro-magnetic and gravitational wave signatures from these systems; the implications for structure formation at high redshifts.
 Gamma-ray bursts – the relation of gamma-ray burst rates to the globally averaged star formation rate, the morphology and properties of gamma-ray burst host galaxies in the optical, and sub-mm wave-bands, the SN-GRB connection.

Honors and awards
Natarajan was awarded the Emeline Conland Bigelow Fellowship at the Radcliffe Institute of Harvard University in 2008.  In 2009, she was awarded a Guggenheim Fellowship.  Natarajan was also the 2009 recipient of the India Abroad Foundation's "Face of the Future" Award and the recipient of the award for academic achievement from the Global Organization for the People of Indian Origin (GOPIO). Natarajan was elected a fellow of the Royal Astronomical Society in 2009, the American Physical Society in 2010, and the Explorers Club in 2010.  She was awarded a JILA (Joint Institute for Laboratory Astrophysics) Fellowship in 2010. In January, 2011 she was awarded an India Empire NRI award for Achievement in the Sciences in New Delhi, India. She was the Caroline Herschel Distinguished Visitor at the Space Telescope Science Institute in Baltimore for 2011–2012.  In addition to her current appointments at Yale and Harvard, she also holds the Sophie and Tycho Brahe Professorship, Dark Cosmology Center, Niels Bohr Institute at the University of Copenhagen, Denmark and was recently elected to an honorary professorship for life at the University of Delhi.

She is on the scientific advisory board of Nova ScienceNow.

References

External links
 Yale Astronomy Department webpage
 Guggenheim Fellows webpage
 Radcliffe Fellows webpage
 Best NASA Photographs of 2010 from the New Yorker

Indian astrophysicists
American women astronomers
Year of birth missing (living people)
Living people
Indian cosmologists
Indian women physicists
Indian emigrants to the United States
Yale University faculty
Scientists from Tamil Nadu
People from Coimbatore
Massachusetts Institute of Technology School of Science alumni
Alumni of Trinity College, Cambridge
Delhi Public School alumni
Fellows of the Royal Astronomical Society
20th-century Indian astronomers
21st-century Indian astronomers
20th-century American scientists
21st-century American scientists
20th-century Indian women scientists
21st-century Indian women scientists
21st-century American women
20th-century Indian physicists
21st-century Indian physicists
20th-century American women
Scientific American people
Fellows of the American Physical Society